John Konstantinos (August 13, 1936 – March 14, 2013) was an American football player, coach, and college athletics administrator.  He served as the head football coach at Eastern Illinois University from 1975 to 1977, compiling a record of 9–21–2.  Konstantinos was the athletic director at Cleveland State University from 1990 to 2002.  Konstantinos was born on August 13, 1936, in Yorkville, Ohio.  He died on March 14, 2013, in Copley, Ohio.

Head coaching record

References

1936 births
2013 deaths
Arkansas Razorbacks football coaches
Charleston Golden Eagles football players
Cleveland State Vikings athletic directors
Eastern Illinois Panthers football coaches
Kent State Golden Flashes football players
NC State Wolfpack football coaches
Temple Owls football coaches
William & Mary Tribe football coaches
People from Yorkville, Ohio
Players of American football from Ohio